ARIS IV (Anti-tank Rocket Infantry System, also referred to as Aris) was a portable one-shot 113 mm anti-tank weapon, built in Greece and designed by the Hellenic Arms Industry (EBO) in 1984. It had a maximum range of 400m and penetration capability 700mm of steel. Lighter versions (anti-personnel etc.) had also been developed. In addition, it utilised locally developed composite parts, in an effort to reduce the overall weight.

External links 
ARIS IV Rocket

Anti-tank rockets
Weapons of Greece
Military equipment introduced in the 1980s